Dasypogon is a genus of robber flies in the family Asilidae. There are at least 80 described species in Dasypogon.

Species
These 84 species belong to the genus Dasypogon:

 Dasypogon acratus Walker, 1849 c g
 Dasypogon aegon Walker, 1848 c g
 Dasypogon aequalis (Walker, 1857) c
 Dasypogon agathyllus Walker, 1848 c g
 Dasypogon analis Macquart, 1850 c g
 Dasypogon anemetus Walker, 1849 c g
 Dasypogon aphidas Walker, 1848 c g
 Dasypogon aphidnus Walker, 1849 c g
 Dasypogon arcuatus (Fabricius, 1794) c g
 Dasypogon atratus (Fabricius, 1794) c g
 Dasypogon atripennis (Macquart, 1834) c g
 Dasypogon atripes Fabricius, 1805 c g
 Dasypogon aurarius Wiedemann, 1821 c g
 Dasypogon auripilus (Seguy, 1934) c g
 Dasypogon australis Macquart, 1838 c g
 Dasypogon bacescui Weinberg, 1979 c g
 Dasypogon barrus Walker, 1849 c g
 Dasypogon bigoti Bellardi, 1861 c g
 Dasypogon bonariensis Macquart, 1838 c g
 Dasypogon brevipennis (Meigen, 1838) c g
 Dasypogon caffer (Wiedemann, 1828) c g
 Dasypogon carvilius Walker, 1849 c g
 Dasypogon castigans Walker, 1851 c g
 Dasypogon caudatus (Fabricius, 1805) c g
 Dasypogon cephicus Say, 1829 c g
 Dasypogon cerretanus Walker, 1848 c g
 Dasypogon coon Walker, 1849 c g
 Dasypogon copreus Walker, 1849 c g
 Dasypogon costalis Lynch Arribalzaga, 1880 c g
 Dasypogon crassus Macquart, 1849 c g
 Dasypogon diadema (Fabricius, 1781) c g
 Dasypogon dorsalis (Wiedemann, 1824) c g
 Dasypogon equestris Wiedemann, 1828 c g
 Dasypogon fabricii Wiedemann, 1820 c g
 Dasypogon flavipennis Macquart, 1846 c g
 Dasypogon fossius (Walker, 1849) c g
 Dasypogon fraternus Macquart, 1846 c g
 Dasypogon fuscipennis Macquart, 1834 c g
 Dasypogon geradi Weinberg, 1987 g
 Dasypogon gerardi Weinberg, 1988 c g
 Dasypogon gougeleti (Bigot, 1878) c g
 Dasypogon grandis Macquart, 1846 c g
 Dasypogon iberus Tomasovic, 1999 c g
 Dasypogon insertus Walker, 1851 c g
 Dasypogon irinelae Weinberg, 1986 c g
 Dasypogon kugleri Weinberg, 1986 c g
 Dasypogon lebasii Macquart, 1838 c g
 Dasypogon lenticeps (Thomson, 1869) c g
 Dasypogon longus Macquart, 1838 c g
 Dasypogon luctuosus Macquart, 1838 c g
 Dasypogon lugens Philippi, 1865 c g
 Dasypogon magisi Tomasovic, 1999 c g
 Dasypogon maricus Walker, 1849 c g
 Dasypogon melanogaster g
 Dasypogon melanopterus Loew, 1869 c g
 Dasypogon mexicanus Macquart, 1846 c g
 Dasypogon nigriventris Dufour, 1833 c g
 Dasypogon occlusus Meijere, 1906 c g
 Dasypogon octonotatus Loew, 1869 c g
 Dasypogon olcesci (Bigot, 1878) c g
 Dasypogon parvus Rondani, 1851 c g
 Dasypogon potitus Walker, 1849 c g
 Dasypogon pumilus Macquart, 1838 c g
 Dasypogon punctipennis Macquart, 1838 c g
 Dasypogon rapax Walker, 1851 c g
 Dasypogon regenstreifi Weinberg, 1986 c g
 Dasypogon reinhardi Wiedemann, 1824 c g
 Dasypogon rubiginipennis Macquart, 1838 c g
 Dasypogon rubiginosum (Bigot, 1878) c g
 Dasypogon rubinipes (Becker & Stein, 1913) c g
 Dasypogon rufescens (Macquart, 1834) c g
 Dasypogon ruficauda (Fabricius, 1805) c g
 Dasypogon rufipes Philippi, 1865 c g
 Dasypogon rufiventris Walker, 1854 c g
 Dasypogon sericeus Philippi, 1865 c g
 Dasypogon sicanus Costa, 1854 c g
 Dasypogon silanus Walker, 1849 c g
 Dasypogon tenuis Macquart, 1838 c g
 Dasypogon torridus (Walker, 1856) c g
 Dasypogon tragicus (Wiedemann, 1828) c g
 Dasypogon tripartitus Walker, 1854 c g
 Dasypogon tsacasi Weinberg, 1991 c g
 Dasypogon variabilis Brullé, 1833 c g
 Dasypogon volcatius Walker, 1849 c g

Data sources: c = Catalogue of Life, g = GBIF, b = Bugguide.net

References

Further reading

 
 

Asilidae genera